Helen Morgan may refer to:
Helen Morgan (singer) (1900–1941) was an American singer and actress.
Helen Morgan (field hockey) (1966–2020), Welsh field hockey player
Helen Morgan (Miss World) (born 1952), Welsh actress, model, TV host and beauty queen
Helen Morgan (Playhouse 90), an American television play
Helen Clarissa Morgan (1845–1914), American educator
Helen Morgan (politician) (born 1975), British politician
Helen Morgan, the married name of diver Helen Crlenkovich

See also
Helen Morgenthau Fox (1884–1974), American botanist and author of popular gardening books